Wow is the third studio album of Chinese singer Bibi Zhou, released on December 18, 2007.

Track listing
 "Wow" – 3:42
 "No Rest for the Whole Year" (全年无休) – 2:41
 "Repeat" (反复) – 3:45
 "Just to Meet You" (为了认识你) – 3:50
 "The Desert Can Also Find Paris" (沙漠也找到巴黎) – 4:02
 "Silly Genius" (傻瓜的天才) – 2:54
 "Cat's Adventure" (猫的冒险) – 4:11
 "How" (怎样) – 3:49
 "Oh Yes!!" – 3:13
 "Sweat" (汗) – 4:40

2007 albums
Bibi Zhou albums